Didier Malherbe (born January 22, 1943 in Paris), is a French jazz, rock and world music musician, known as a member of the bands Gong and Hadouk, as well as a poet.

His first instrument was a saxophone, but he also plays flutes, alto clarinet, ocarina, Laotian Khen, Bawu flute, Hulusi and many other wind instruments. Since 1995, duduk has been his preferred instrument.

Before Gong (1960–69) 
Didier Malherbe began playing saxophone at age 13 after hearing Charlie Parker's "Bloomdido", a title he later would adopt as his nickname. After two years of formal training on saxophone he began to participate in jam sessions at various Paris jazz clubs alongside the likes of Alby Cullaz, Eddy Louiss, Jacques Thollot ... He then moved away from jazz. "I had grown puzzled about bebop because of so many rules. Then free jazz arrived, which got rid of all the rules... I decided I'd rather look elsewhere".

In 1962, after hearing the first Ravi Shankar album, he travelled to India, where he discovered bamboo flute and learned to play bansuri, Indian bamboo flute. Back in Paris, he took classical flute lessons, while studying ancient languages at the Sorbonne university. 
In 1964-65, he travelled around Morocco, staying in a community in Tangier, playing with other hippie musicians such as guitarist Davey Graham and absorbing elements of Arabic music.

In 1966, he appeared on the soundtrack for the movie Chappaqua, credited to Ravi Shankar, and dabbled with rock music for the first time, electrifying his sax when he appeared, as part of a band called Les Rollsticks, in  Marc'O's successful comedy-rock Les Idoles. This was such a hit that it was made into a feature film in 1968.

In the summer of 1968, Malherbe left for Majorca, in the Balearic Islands, where he found shelter in the property of writer Robert Graves. There he worked on improving his flute playing, and spent time with Kevin Ayers and Daevid Allen, two former members of Soft Machine, whose performance at the Fenêtre Rose festival in late 1967 he later called "a triggering event."

In 1969, back in Paris, he joined a raga-blues-folk trio, Morning Calm, and played free jazz with American pianist Burton Greene, appearing on his album recorded for the BYG label. The same label released Magick Brother (1969), the first Gong album, on which Malherbe appeared alongside musicians of various backgrounds, whether pop or jazz.

The Gong Years (1969–77) 
Gong became a real band for an appearance at the Amougies festival in October 1969. Malherbe received the stage name Bloomdido Bad De Grasse from Daevid Allen, a combination of the title of the Charlie Parker standard and a rough English translation of his surname.

The albums Camembert Electrique (1971) and Continental Circus (1972, soundtrack for Jérôme Laperrousaz's movie of the same name) made Gong, along with Magma and others, a key player on the French underground scene of the early 1970s, pioneering the MJC (youth clubs) circuit. Allen's faithful right-hand man, Bloomdido stoically survived the band's countless line-up changes, even staying on after Allen himself quit in 1975 following the Radio Gnome Invisible trilogy, released by the then-fledgling Virgin label : Flying Teapot and Angel's Egg (1973), then You (1974). Malherbe achieved a unique sound by electrifying his instrument, and brought to the band many melodic ideas, "which I freely gave away, in a communal spirit. That's one of the features of my character and my music : I am a spontaneous guy, an improviser."

Following the departures in 1975 of Allen then Steve Hillage, Gong moved to a more jazz-fusion style, influenced by Weather Report, with Malherbe adding a world-music flavour, as exemplified by "Bambooji" on the Shamal (1976) album, an early pointer to his later work as a solo artist. A final line-up with a percussion section and Allan Holdsworth on guitar recorded Gazeuse! (1977).
"He has always been, and remains, the best musician Gong ever had. He is a true virtuoso - but to the point that he never shows it" - Daevid Allen (1977)

Bloom (1977–81) and Faton Bloom (1982–87) 
In 1977, Didier Malherbe formed the band Bloom playing "jazz-rock, but performed in a personal way, with odd time signatures, some funky ideas and crazy lyrics,". They recorded an eponymous album in 1978, the band regularly toured France. In 1981, it was replaced by smaller line-ups, Duo du Bas with Yan Emeric Vagh, and Duo Ad lib with Jean-Philippe Rykiel.

In 1978, Didier played on 3 songs on Gilli Smyth 's Charly Records release "Mother," also appearing on her "Fairy Tales" LP under the band name "Mother Gong," featuring guitarist Harry Williamson.

In 1980, Didier recorded perhaps his first solo album, "Bloom," with a jazz-fusion sound common to that era, but with distinctly French vocals and artsy oddities.
 
In 1982, Malherbe began a partnership with Faton Cahen, former pianist with Magma and Zao, which they logically called Faton-Bloom. The band was completed by Rémy Sarrazin (bass), Éric Bedoucha (drums) and Roger Raspail. An eponymous album appeared in 1986, accompanied by copious touring.

During that period he also worked with singer Jacques Higelin , on stage (the live album Casino de Paris in 1984) and in studio (the album Ai in 1985). 

He also played on the first album by Equip'Out, a band led by ex-Gong drummer Pip Pyle, and joined Daevid Allen in a new line-up of Gong, which resulted in the album Shapeshifter (1992).

Solo / Duo (1990–98) 
In 1990, Didier Malherbe released his first true solo album, Fetish, surrounded by a cast of thousands. He later called the album "very scattered." He notably experimented with the wind synthesizer Yamaha WX7.

He then signed with the Tangram label, releasing Zeff in 1992, which was a major critical and commercial success. The unique sound of the Zeff, a harmonic bent PVC pipe, also graced Vangelis' soundtrack for Ridley Scott's movie 1492: Christopher Columbus, and was featured on public TV channel France 3.

This was followed by Fluvius (1994), with a quartet including Loy Ehrlich, Henri Agnel and Shyamal Maïtra. 
In 1996, birth of "Hadouk" with Loy Ehrlich, so named in reference to their respective instruments of choice, guembri Hajhouj (bass of the Gnawas of Morocco) and duduk (Doudouk,double-reed Armenian oboe).

Also during the 1990s, Malherbe kept touring with Classic Gong, in both Europe and the USA. He finally left the band in 1999, but continued to appear occasionally as a guest-star, both on stage Subterranea DVD and on records Zero To Infinity and 2032.
 
He also toured and recorded with Brigitte Fontaine Cd Palaces 
and with acoustic guitarist Pierre Bensusan Live at the New Morning CD in 1997.

Hadouk Trio (1999–2012) 
In 1999, the Malherbe/Ehrlich duo was joined by American percussionist Steve Shehan and released the album Shamanimal as Hadouk Trio. Helped by excellent critical reception, the trio appeared at major festivals such as Nancy Jazz Pulsations. In 2001 his mastery of the duduk also led for an invitation by Djivan Gasparyan to appear at the international duduk festival in Armenia, then in Moscow and St Petersburg.

That same year, he published a book of sonnets on reeds, L'Anche des Métamorphoses, which he later turned into a solo show, mixing poetry reading and musical interludes.

In 2003 the second Hadouk Trio CD, Now, saw the light of day. The trio appeared at the San Sebastián festival, at Jazz Sous Les Pommiers, and released two live documents, the double CD Live à FIP (2004) and the DVD Live au Satellit Café (2005), which began a long-term partnership with (Naïve Records)

The release of the trio's third studio CD Utopies (2006) coincided with an appearance at the Gong Unconvention in Amsterdam, a festival which peaked with the reunion of Gong's 1970s line-up. Two concerts at Paris' Cabaret Sauvage in May 2007 were documented on the live CD/DVD Baldamore. A few days later, Hadouk Trio received the "year's best band" award at the Victoires du Jazz ceremony.

The trio's final release, Air Hadouk, came out in 2010. It was followed by tours in Great Britain and India, and an appearance at the Paris Jazz Festival. In 2013, Naive reissued the first 4 Hadouk Trio CDs as a box set, which coincided with a concert at the legendary Salle Gaveau on 2 February.

In 2010 he formed a duo with guitarist Éric Löhrer, releasing the double-CD Nuit d'Ombrelle the following year, which mixed jazz standards on duduk and improvisations, arranged as a continuous suite.

Since 2012 he has been playing with classical pianist Jean-François Zygel, appearing on his TV programme La Boite a Musique France 2 and performing live as a trio with percussionist Joel Grare under the title A World Tour In 80 Minutes.

Hadouk Quartet (2013–2020) 
In May 2013, Malherbe and Loy Ehrlich opened a new chapter in the Hadouk saga on the occasion of a residency at the club Le Triton, this time in quartet with Éric Löhrer on guitar and Jean-Luc Di Fraya on percussion and vocals. The quartet released their début CD, Hadoukly Yours on the Naïve Records. He added two Chinese wind instruments: Bawu and Hulusi. 
March 2017, release of a new CD "Le Cinquieme Fruit" on Naïve label.

February 2018, publication of a second book of sonnets "Escapade en Facilie" publisher Le Castor Astral.

October 2018 concerts in Taiwan " Round about Duduk " for the festival ASIA-PACIFIC traditional Art.

Solo/Duo Show - Music & Poetry (2013-2022) 
Didier Malherbe has published two books of sonnets: L'Anche des Métamorphoses, reissued by Buissonnières, and Escapade en Facilie.

With his favorite instruments the saxophone, the Bawuflute and  the Chinese Hulusi, the alto clarinet, the ocarina, the Laotian khên, the Ukrainian sopilka, the Moldavian pipe, the "drum tops17" the Armenian duduk, he created a show slam poetry alternating with music performed at the RAMI Festival, the National Stage in Orléans, at the Triton , at the Nanterre Conservatory, at the Baud Media Library, at the Poetry Market in Paris, at the Esprit Frappeur (Lausanne, at the Domaine de Chamarande Lardy (with La Tribu au Sud du Nord, a band made up of big names in French jazz).

2020 - Accompanies the poet Zeno Bianu to the Roman Museum in Vienna for the presentation of his book on Chet Baker. On the radio, France Musique broadcast "Ocora Couleurs du Monde" public recording, solo poetry and music. Participates in the recording of the CD of the group Alula "Heliotropics"

2022 - Concert/Exhibition by Yochk'o Seffer Paris, with Nara Noïan l'An Vert Liège, Duo with Philippe Laccarrière, Duo with Yaping Wang  

Hadouk Duo with Loy Ehrlich the Hadouk adventure,Trio then Quartet, started with a Duet! Here it is again ! Triton

Discography

With Gong 
 1970: Magick Brother (BYG)
 1971: Camembert Electrique (BYG)
 1971: Continental Circus (Phillips)
 1972: Glastonbury Fayre 1971 (Revelation)
 1973: Flying Teapot (BYG/Virgin)
 1973: Angel's Egg (Virgin)
 1974: You (Virgin) 
 1976: Shamal (Virgin)
 1977: Gazeuse! (Virgin)
 1977: Gong est mort, vive Gong (Tapioca/Celluloïd)
 1977: Live Etc. (Virgin)
 1990: Live au Bataclan 1973 (Mantra)
 1990: Live at Sheffield 74 (Mantra)
 1992: Shapeshifter (Mélodie/Celluloïd)
 2000: Zero to Infinity (Snapper Music)
 2009: 2032 (G-Wave)
 2016: Rejoice! I'm Dead! (Madfish)
 2019: Love from the Planet Gong - The Virgin years 1973-75 (13 disc box Virgin 675 890-1)

Solo and duo albums 
 1980: Bloom (EMI-Sonopresse, reissued by Voiceprint)
 1986: Faton Bloom (with Faton Cahen) (Cryonic, reissued by Mantra) 
 1987: Saxo Folies (with Armand Frydman) (Koka Media)
 1990: Fetish (Mantra) 
 1992: Zeff (Tangram)
 1994: Fluvius (Tangram)
 1995: Hadouk (with Loy Ehrlich) (Tangram)
 1997: Live at New Morning (with Pierre Bensusan) (Acoustic Music)
 2003: Windprints / L'Empreinte du Vent (Cezame)
 2008: Carnets d'Asie et d'Ailleurs (with Loy Ehrlich) (Vox Terrae)
 2011: Nuit d'Ombrelle with Éric Löhrer  (Naïve Records)
 2021: The Yanqging & the Wind with yaping wang (Cezame)

With Hadouk Trio (Didier Malherbe / Loy Ehrlich / Steve Shehan) 
 1999: Shamanimal (Mélodie rééd. Naïve Records)
 2002: Now  (Mélodie rééd. Naïve Records)
 2004: Hadouk Trio Live à FIP (Mélodie/Abeille Musique)
 2006: Utopies (Naïve Records)
 2007: Baldamore (CD+DVD Live au Cabaret Sauvage) (Naïve Records)
 2010: Air Hadouk (Naïve Records)
 2013: Coffret Intégrale Hadouk Trio (Naïve Records)

With Hadouk Quartet (Didier Malherbe / Loy Ehrlich / Eric Löhrer / Jean-Luc Di Fraya) 
 2013: Hadoukly Yours (Naïve Records)
 2017: "Le Cinquieme Fruit" (Naïve Records)

Other appearances 
 1969: Aquariana (Burton Greene) (BYG)
 1971: Obsolete (Dashiell Hedayat) (Shandar, reissued by Mantra)
 1972: Whatevershebringswesing (Kevin Ayers) (Harvest)
 1974: Hatfield and the North (Hatfield and the North) (Virgin)
 1974: To Keep from Crying (Comus) (Virgin)
 1974: Vibrarock (Robert Wood) (Polydor)
 1975: Clearlight Symphony (Clearlight) (Virgin)
 1975: Fish Rising (Steve Hillage) (Virgin)
 1978: Visions (Clearlight) (Polydor)
 1979: Downwind (Pierre Moerlen’s Gong) (Arista)
 1980: Live (Pierre Moerlen’s Gong) (Arista)
 1981: Robot Woman 1 (Mother Gong) (Butt)
 1981: Battle of the Birds (with Harry Williamson, Anthony Phillips and Gilli Smyth) (Ottersongs, reissued by Voiceprint)
 1982: Solilaï (Pierre Bensusan) (RCA)
 1982: Robot Woman 2 (Mother Gong) (Shanghai)
 1982: N (Lili Drop) (Arabella)
 1983: Casino de Paris (Jacques Higelin) (Pathé-Marconi)
 1985: Aï (Jacques Higelin) (Pathé-Marconi)
 1987: Pip Pyle’s Equip’Out (Pip Pyle’s Equip’Out) (52è Rue Est, reissued by Voiceprint)
 1988: Orchestra V (Mimi Lorenzini) (Muséa)
 1988: Tarka (Anthony Phillips & Harry Williamson) (PRT/Baillemont, reissued by Voiceprint)
 1989: French Corazon (Brigitte Fontaine) (Midi)
 1991: Urgent Meeting (Un Drame Musical Instantané) (GRRR)
 1993: Live (Short Wave) (Gimini)
 1993: Les Îles du Désert (Loy Ehrlich) (Tangram)
 1994: R.S.V.P. (Richard Sinclair) (Sinclair Songs)
 1994: Aux Héros de la Voltige (Jacques Higelin) (EMI)
 1997: Les Palaces (Brigitte Fontaine) (Virgin)
 1998: Seven Year Itch (Pip Pyle) (Voiceprint)
 2000: Soup Songs Live - The Music of Robert Wyatt (Annie Whitehead – Soupsongs) (Voiceprint)
 2001: Kekeland (Brigitte Fontaine) (Virgin)
 2005: Folklores Imaginaires (Eric Séva) (Harmonia Mundi)
 2006: Elevations (Steve Shehan) (Safar Éditions)
 2006: Conspiracy Theories (Phil Miller’s In Cahoots) (Crescent Discs)
 2010: Le Triomphe de l'Amour (Areski Belkacem) (Universal)
 2014: Impressionist Symphony (Clearlight) (Gonzo Multimedia)
 2017 : Jésus de Nazareth à Jérusalem (Pascal Obispo) CD BO du spectacle (Sony)
 2017 : Bledi (Hend Zouari) (Diwan Musik Company)
 2017 : Tara (Jan Schumacher) CD Jazzenvue
 2018 : Bô,le Voyage Musical  (Catherine Lara ) CD BO du spectacle (Warner)
 2021 : Héliotropiques  (ALULA ) CC 03

Filmography 
 1967: Chappaqua by Conrad Rooks (music by Ravi Shankar)
 1968: Les Idoles by Marc'O (music by Stéphane Vilar and Patrick Greussay)
 1972: Continental Circus by Jérôme Laperrousaz (with Gong)
 1972: Le Grand Départ by Martial Raysse (with Gong)
 1992: 1492 : Christophe Colomb by Ridley Scott (music by Vangelis)
 1999: Les Quatre Saisons d'Espigoule by Christian Philibert (music by Michel Korb)
 2004 : Blueberry by Jan Kounen (music : Jean-Jacques Hertz et François Roy )
 2005: [[Kirikou et les Bêtes sauvages]] by Michel Ocelot (music : Manu Dibango)
 2005: Iznogoud by Patrick Braoudé (music : Jacques Davidovici)
 2006: Sa Majesté Minor by Jean-Jacques Annaud (music by Javier Navarreté)
 2007:  99 Francs  by Jan Kounen (music : Jean-Jacques Hertz et François Roy)
 2010: The Lady by Luc Besson (music by Éric Serra)
 2013 : La danza de la realidad de Alejandro Jodorowsky (musique Adan Jodorowsky)
 2015: Romantic Warriors III: Canterbury Tales (DVD)
 2021: Les Survivants by Guillaume Renusson (music by Olivier Militon)

Notes

References

External links 
Official site
Interview with Didier Malherbe at allaboutjazz.com
Some music from Didier Malherbe available here 

Canterbury scene
French jazz saxophonists
Male saxophonists
Progressive rock musicians
1943 births
Living people
Musicians from Paris
Gong (band) members
21st-century saxophonists
21st-century French male musicians
French male jazz musicians